A heat rock is the common name for a type of heating source in enclosures for cold-blooded animals to supply heat, in the form of a false novelty rock plugged into an electrical socket.

Keepers may notice that smaller reptiles prefer to rest on the heat rock most of the time, since it provides constant heat. Larger reptiles supplied with heat rocks often prefer to stay near their rock at all times, diminishing their novelty.

Pet owners and keepers now usually recommended a non-direct contact UTH (under-the-tank-heater) or thermal tape which distributes heat through the enclosure’s substrate placed in different areas of the tank to create a more even heat gradient, making the pet more liable to move throughout its enclosure. Another popular solution is replacing regular lighting with UV-specific basking lights.

External links
http://www.anapsid.org/hotrock.html

Pet equipment